Klugiella xanthotipulae is a species of bacteria from the family Microbacteriaceae which has been isolated from a larva of the insect Tipula abdominalis from Michigan in the United States.

The genus, Klugiella, is named after the American microbiologist Michael J. Klug.

References

Microbacteriaceae
Bacteria described in 2008
Monotypic bacteria genera